Susanne Wolff (born 1 May 1973) is a German actress. Her credits include the television series Morgen hör ich auf and the films Styx and Das Fremde in mir.

Wolff was born in Bielefeld.  She studied at the Hochschule für Musik, Theater und Medien Hannover.

Partial filmography
 2006 :  
 2007 :  
 2008 : 
 2011 : The Three Musketeers
 2014 : Über-Ich und Du
 2016 :  
 2017 : Return to Montauk
 2018 : Styx 
 2018 : 
 2023 : Sisi & I as Empress Elisabeth of Austria

References

External links

1973 births
German film actresses
Living people
Actors from Bielefeld